Robert William Nelson (born March 3, 1959) is a retired American football nose tackle who played in the National Football League. He played for the Tampa Bay Buccaneers for one season and the Green Bay Packers for two seasons. Prior to entering the NFL, Nelson had a stint with the Arizona Outlaws of the USFL.  Nelson played college football at the University of Miami (Florida).

Nelson gained a bit of fame in the early 1990s through his inclusion in the Nintendo home video game "Tecmo Super Bowl."  Nelson was among the most dominant defensive players in the game, even though he played as a nose tackle, a position in which the primary responsibility is to occupy offensive linemen to allow other defensive players to make tackles.  Nelson's speed in the game enabled him to make a sack on nearly every play as a human-controlled player.  As a result, players of Tecmo Super Bowl frequently agree not to use the play.

External links
NFL.com player page

1959 births
Living people
Players of American football from Baltimore
American football defensive linemen
Miami Hurricanes football players
Green Bay Packers players
Tampa Bay Buccaneers players
Oklahoma Outlaws players
Arizona Wranglers players
Jacksonville Bulls players